Campsas is a commune in the Tarn-et-Garonne department in the Occitanie region in southern France.

 The commune hosts a large production centre of Liebherr Aerospace.

See also
Communes of the Tarn-et-Garonne department
Liebherr Aerospace

References

Communes of Tarn-et-Garonne